The 314th Air Division is an inactive United States Air Force unit. Its last assignment was with Pacific Air Forces at Osan Air Base, South Korea. It became inactive in September 1986.

The unit's origins lie with the World War II 314th Bombardment Wing, which was part of the Twentieth Air Force of the United States Army Air Forces. The 314th engaged in bombing operations against Japan using Boeing B-29 Superfortresses.

History

World War II

The 314th Bombardment Wing was activated in July 1944 at Peterson Field, Colorado as a command organization for four Boeing B-29 Superfortress bombardment groups. The unit trained in Colorado while subordinate groups were trained in Kansas by the Second Air Force.
When training was completed the 314th moved to Guam in the Mariana Islands of the Central Pacific Area in January 1945 The 314th was the fourth B-29 Wing assigned to XXI Bomber Command, Twentieth Air Force. Its mission was the strategic bombardment of the Japanese Home Islands and the destruction of its war-making capability. In the Marianas, the Wing commanded the 19th, 29th 39th and 330th Bombardment Groups. The 19th and 29th arrived in January; the 39th and 330th in February.

Its groups flew "shakedown" missions against Japanese targets on Moen Island, Truk, and other points in the Carolines and Marianas. The 19th began combat missions over Japan on 25 February 1945 with a firebombing mission over Northeast Tokyo; the 29th with a firebombing mission over central Tokyo on 9 March. The 39th's first mission was an attack of the Hodagaya Chemical Works in Koriyama on 15 April; the 330th hitting the same three days earlier on 12 April. The Division continued attacking urban areas until the end of the war in August 1945; its subordinate units conducted raids against strategic objectives, bombing aircraft factories; chemical plants; oil refineries; and other targets in Japan. The wing flew its last combat missions on 14 August when hostilities ended. Afterwards, the wing's B 29s carried relief supplies to Allied prisoner of war camps in Japan and Manchuria.

The 330th Bomb Group was relieved from assignment on 21 November, its personnel and equipment returning to the United States for demobilization; the 39th in December.  The other groups returned in May 1946.  The Wing then moved to Johnson Army Air Base, Japan in mid-May 1946 to become part of the Fifth Air Force Occupation forces.

With the postwar consolidation of units, the organization was redesignated 314th Composite Wing in 1946, having both groups and squadrons of varying missions assigned to the wing. For approximately two years (1946–1948) the 314th served as one of Fifth Air Force's major components. "It maintained intensive training schedules, participated in training exercises and took part in the post-hostilities program of mapping Japan."

Korean War

Activated at Nagoya AB, Japan, on 1 December 1950 as the 314th Air Division, the organization immediately assumed the missions of the air defense of Japan, logistical support for Fifth Air Force during the Korean War, and airfield construction in Japan. Units under the Division's direct jurisdiction during the Korean War were the following:
 4th Fighter-Interceptor Wing, F-86 Sabre (Air Defense)
 374th Troop Carrier Wing, C-46 Commando; C-47 Skytrain (Airlift)
 437th Troop Carrier Wing, C-46 Commando (Airlift)
 452d Bombardment Wing, B-26 Invader (Tactical bombing in Korea)
 41st Fighter-Interceptor Squadron, F-80 Shooting Star (Air Defense)
 91st Strategic Reconnaissance Squadron, RB-45, RB-29, RB-50 (Strategic Reconnaissance)

On 1 March 1952 the 314th Air Division stood down, as part of a Far East Air Force reorganization. Its units were reassigned to other organizations.

Cold War
Reactivated in March 1955 at Osan Air Base, South Korea, the 314th Air Division was the primary command organization in South Korea for the next 30 years. "The division maintained assigned and attached forces at a high degree of combat readiness during the Cold War. In fulfilling its mission, the division supported numerous military exercises in the region, such as Commando Bearcat, Commando Jade, and Commando Night."

The Division was inactivated in 1986 and was replaced by the reactivated Seventh Air Force, which assumed all of its assigned assets.

Lineage
314th Air Division
 Established as the 314th Bombardment Wing, Very Heavy on 15 April 1944.
 Activated on 23 April 1944
 Redesignated 314th Composite Wing on 15 April 1946
 Inactivated on 20 August 1948
 Redesignated 314th Air Division on 21 November 1950
 Activated on 1 December 1950
 Inactivated on 1 March 1952
 Activated on 15 March 1955
 Consolidated with Table of Distribution 314th Air Division on 1 July 1978
 Inactivated on 8 September 1986

Table of Distribution 314th Air Division
 Established as the 314th Air Division on 13 August 1948
 Organized on 18 August 1948
 Discontinued on 1 March 1950
 Consolidated with 314th Air Division on 1 July 1978

Assignments
 Second Air Force, 23 April 1944
 XXI Bomber Command, 8 June 1944
 Twentieth Air Force, 16 July 1945
 Fifth Air Force, 15 May 1946
 V Bomber Command, 30 May 1946
 Fifth Air Force, 31 May 1946 – 1 March 1950
 Fifth Air Force, 1 December 1950
 Far East Air Forces, 18 May 1951 – 1 March 1952
 Fifth Air Force, 15 March 1955 – 8 September 1986

Units assigned

World War II

 19th Bombardment Group: c. 9 December 1944 – 15 May 1946
 29th Bombardment Group: c. 9 November 1944 – 15 May 1946 (not operational after, 12 February 1946)
 31st Air Service Group: c. 9 December 1944 – 15 May 1946
 39th Bombardment Group: 18 February-27 December 1945
 69th Air Service Group: c. 9 November 1944 – 15 May 1946
 89th Air Service Group: 18 February-27 December 1945
 90th Air Service Group: c. 9 Nov 1944-c. 21 November 1945
 330th Bombardment Group: c. 9 Nov 1944-c. 21 November 1945

United States Air Force
Wings

 3d Bombardment Wing (later 3d Tactical Fighter Wing): 18 August 1948 – 1 March 1950, 15 March 1971 – 16 September 1974
 4th Fighter-Interceptor Wing: attached 22 December 1950 – 7 May 1951
 8th Tactical Fighter Wing: 16 September 1974 – 8 September 1986
 18th Fighter-Bomber Wing: 1 March 1955 – 31 January 1957
 35th Fighter Wing (later 35th Fighter-Interceptor Wing): 18 August 1948 – 1 March 1950, 25 May 1951 – 1 March 1952
 49th Fighter Wing (later 49th Fighter-Bomber Wing): 18 August 1948 – 1 March 1950
 51st Fighter Wing (later 51st Composite Wing, 51st Tactical Fighter Wing): 1 November 1971 – 8 September 1986

 58th Fighter-Bomber Wing: attached 15 March 1955 – 31 December 1956, assigned 1 January 1957 – 1 July 1958
 116th Fighter-Bomber Wing: 24 July 1951 – 1 March 1952
 374th Troop Carrier Wing: 1 December 1950 – 25 January 1951 (detached entire period)
 437th Troop Carrier Wing: 1 December 1950 – 25 January 1951 (detached entire period)
 452d Bombardment Wing: 1 December 1950 – 25 May 1951
 6013th Operations Wing (Northern Area): 2 November 1951 – 1 March 1952
 6014th Operations Wing (Central Area): 2 November 1951 – 1 March 1952
 6015th Operations Wing (Southern Area): 2 November 1951 – 1 March 1952

Groups
 3d Bombardment Group: 31 May 1946 – 18 August 1948
 35th Fighter Group: 31 May 1946 – 18 August 1948
 58th Tactical Missile Group: 24 April 1959 – 25 March 1962
 71st Reconnaissance Group: 15 April 1947 – 18 August 1948 (not operational after 15 April 1947, detached after 31 October 1947)
 6146th Air Force Advisory Group (Republic of Korea Air Force) (later 6146th Flying Training Group, 6146th Air Force Advisory Group): 15 March – 24 September 1955, 18 September 1956 – 1 April 1971

Squadrons
 6th Night Fighter Squadron: 10 June 1946 – 20 February 1947 (detached after 7 September 1946)
 8th Photographic Reconnaissance Squadron (later 8th Tactical Reconnaissance Squadron): Assigned 31 May 1946 – 28 February 1947 (not operational 31 May – 16 December 1946, detached 16 September – 16 December 1946), attached 28 February – c. 31 October 1947, attached 18 April 1949 – 1 March 1950
 9th Reconnaissance Squadron: 20 June 1946 – 20 October 1947 (detached after 25 September 1946)
 19th Tactical Air Support Squadron: 15 January 1972 – 30 September 1974
 20th Reconnaissance Squadron: 31 May – 20 June 1946
 41st Fighter-Interceptor Squadron: attached 1 December 1950 – 25 May 1951
 56th Strategic Reconnaissance Squadron: attached 18 May 1951 – 1 March 1952
 63d Bombardment Squadron: attached 1–29 September 1947
 65th Bombardment Squadron: 1–29 January 1947
 68th Fighter Squadron (later 68th Fighter-Interceptor Squadron): 1 December 1950 – 1 March 1952 (detached entire period)
 82d Tactical Reconnaissance Squadron (later 82d Reconnaissance Squadron): 31 May 1946 – 28 February 1947; attached 28 February – November 1947
 91st Strategic Reconnaissance Squadron: attached 18 May 1951 – 1 March 1952
 157th Liaison Squadron: 31 May – 1 June 1946
 310th Fighter-Bomber Squadron: 1–15 July 1958 (not operational)
 334th Fighter-Interceptor Squadron: attached 7 May – 27 June 1951
 335th Fighter-Interceptor Squadron: attached 20 September – 4 November 1951
 336th Fighter-Interceptor Squadron: attached 27 June – 20 September 1951
 339th Fighter Squadron (later, 339th Fighter-Interceptor Squadron): attached 15 December 1946 – 20 February 1947 (not operational); 20 February 1947 – 18 August 1948; assigned 1 December 1950 – 1 March 1952 (detached entire period)
 342d Bombardment Squadron: attached 1 – 28 August 1947
 431st Fighter Squadron: attached 1 March – unknown 1947
 436th Bombardment Squadron: attached 1 – 30 May 1947
 492d Bombardment Squadron: attached 2–30 July 1947
 6156th Flying Training Squadron (Trans ROKAF): 15 March – 14 September 1955

Stations
 Peterson Field, Colorado, 23 April – 9 December 1944
 North Field, Mariana Islands, 16 January 1945 – 15 May 1946
 Johnson Army Air Base (later Johnson Air Force Base, Johnson Air Base), Japan, 15 May 1946 – 1 March 1950
 Nagoya Air Base, Japan, 1 December 1950 – 1 March 1952
 Osan Ni Air Base (later Osan Air Base), South Korea, 15 March 1955 – 7 November 1978, 1 April 1979 – 8 September 1986.
 Yong San, South Korea, 7 November 1978 – 1 April 1979

See also

 List of United States Air Force air divisions

References

Notes
 Explanatory notes

 Citations

Bibliography

 
 
 
 

Military units and formations established in 1944
Japan campaign
World War II strategic bombing units
World War II aerial operations and battles of the Pacific theatre
Air divisions of the United States Air Force